Richard Geoghegan (1717–1800) was an Irish agriculturist.

A descendant of the Geoghegan clan, his ancestor, Art MacGeoghegan of Castletown, County Westmeath, was transplanted to Connacht in 1656, receiving a grant of nine hundred acres and Bunown Castle, Connemara, County Galway.

His family inhabited the original castle until Richard built a new castle (though using the same name) at the foot of Doon Hill.

James Hardiman described him as a man of science and enterprising genius, studying a Dutch method of land reclamation, which resulted in recovering a considerable tract of land from the sea at Ballyconneely. This work was commemorated by an inscription in Latin on a weir, dated 1758.

His son, John, took the additional name of O'Neill. The family abandoned the area in the late 19th century.

References

 'The History of Galway', Sean Spellissy, 1999. 

People from County Galway
1717 births
1800 deaths